Metarbela naumanni is a moth in the family Cossidae. It is found in Namibia and South Africa.

References

Natural History Museum Lepidoptera generic names catalog

Metarbelinae
Moths described in 2005